Hemimysis lamornae is a small crustacean that lives in shallow waters at a depth of between 5 and 20 metres.

Distribution
Hemimysis lamornae is found in the North Sea, Baltic Sea, Mediterranean Sea, and Black Sea.

Description
Hemimysis lamornae is bright red or orange and grows to a size of about 8 to 10 mm. They feed primarily on sedimentary organic matter and small crustaceans. They reproduce sexually and females carry the eggs on the underside of their bodies before they hatch.

References

Sources
Rastorgueff, P. A., Harmelin-Vivien, M., Richard, P., & Chevaldonné, P. (2011). Feeding strategies and resource    partitioning mitigate the effects of oligotrophy for marine cave mysids. Marine Ecology Progress Series, 440, 163–176. https://doi.org/10.3354/meps09347

External links 
 marinespecies.org
 species-identification.org

Mysida